The Wickfield Round Barn is a historic sale barn building located near Cantril in rural Van Buren County, Iowa, United States.  Originally called Silvers Sale Pavilion, it was built in 1919 by Alva Hunt for $20,000. The true round barn measures  in diameter. Frank Silvers, a successful hog breeder and businessman, operated the largest Hampshire hog farm in the world. The first floor had seating for 700 people. Silvers' business offices were also located on the first floor. The structure is constructed of clay tile and features an aerator. The two-pitch roof features eight dormers on the lower part and four dormers on the upper part of the roof. It has been listed on the National Register of Historic Places since 1986. There are no round barns in Iowa used as sale barns any longer, and this one is used for storage.

It is claimed to be the "most unusual use of any round barn in the state and without doubt the most elaborate farm sale barn known to have existed."

References

Sale barns in the United States
Infrastructure completed in 1919
Buildings and structures in Van Buren County, Iowa
Barns on the National Register of Historic Places in Iowa
Round barns in Iowa
National Register of Historic Places in Van Buren County, Iowa